The shak-shak (or chak-chak) is a kind of Antillean musical instrument, similar to maracas or shakers.  They are played in Barbados, Montserrat, Grenada and elsewhere in the Caribbean.  Their uses include Montserratian string bands and the Barbadian crop over festival.

Etymology

The word shak-shak is also spelled as chak-chak, shack-shack, xaque-xaque (in Brazil), and chacha (in Cuba). In the Greater Antilles, it is also known as a maraca, a term that has its roots in the Guarani word . However, in the Antillean islands of Trinidad, Tobago, Grenada, St. Vincent, Barbados, St. Lucia and Martinique, the term maraca is not used to describe the music but is rather associated with Cuban, Venezuelan and American music. They are often made of hollow gourds with beans placed on the inside to make the shaking noise. They are often used in steel bands, typically from the Caribbean. The shak-shak can be heard in the piece "Ol' Time Calypso" by Roger Gibbs. The shak-shak can be heard keeping the rhythm in the background of the music.

References

 

Caribbean musical instruments